Alia Aftab (born 16 November 1965) is a Pakistani politician who was a Member of the Provincial Assembly of the Punjab, from May 2013 to May 2018.

Early life and education
She was born on 16 November 1965 in Lahore.

She earned the degree of Master of Science from the University of the Punjab in 1989 and earned a Doctor of Philosophy in 2007 from American Pacific University.

Political career

She was elected to the Provincial Assembly of the Punjab as a candidate of Pakistan Muslim League (N) on a reserved seat for women in 2013 Pakistani general election.

References

Living people
Women members of the Provincial Assembly of the Punjab
Punjab MPAs 2013–2018
1965 births
Pakistan Muslim League (N) politicians
21st-century Pakistani women politicians